Babacar Sar (born 15 November 1962) is a Mauritanian freestyle wrestler

Sar competed for Mauritania at the 1988 Summer Olympics in the 100 kg freestyle wrestling event, he is the most successful Mauritanian wrestler to date when he won his first two bouts by falls, unfortunately he lost his next two fights and didn't advance to the next round.

References

1962 births
Living people
Olympic wrestlers of Mauritania
Wrestlers at the 1988 Summer Olympics
Mauritanian male sport wrestlers